"Ready" is a song by Dublin-based alternative rock quartet Kodaline. The song was released on 15 May 2015 as the third single from the band's second studio album, Coming Up for Air (2015).

Music video
A music video to accompany the release of "Ready" was first released onto YouTube on 3 June 2015. The music video shows Christopher Mintz-Plasse as a former jockey preparing for a return to horse riding, regardless of his wheelchair. It shows his journey from training to coming face-to-face with horses again. The music video was made in support of the Permanently Disabled Jockeys Fund.

Charts

Composition
"Ready" is written in the key of B♭ major with a tempo of 134 beats per minute.

Release history

References

2015 songs
2015 singles
B-Unique Records singles
Kodaline songs